The  is an electric multiple unit (EMU) train type operated by the Fukuoka City Transportation Bureau on the Hakozaki Line and Kūkō Line in Fukuoka, Japan. The trains also inter-run to/from the Chikuhi Line, operated by Kyushu Railway Company (JR Kyushu).

Design
Because the train line runs near the coast, car bodies were constructed of a stainless steel skin on a conventional steel frame for corrosion resistance. The car bodies are unpainted with blue and white stripes representing the Genkai Sea.
Early trainsets had opening windows, but these were subsequently replaced with sealed windows. The trains have emergency exit doors at the ends. The doors and window wipers were added after refurbishment.

Formation
, the fleet consists of 18 six-car sets formed as follows, with four motored ("M") cars and two non-powered driving trailer ("Tc") cars.

Cars 3 and 5 are each fitted with two cross-arm type pantographs.

Interior
The longitudinal seats are covered with a red moquette and some parts of the saloons feature woodgrain panelling. In 1982, wheelchair spaces were added to the cars. All cars are air-conditioned.

History

The 1000 series entered service on the Fukuoka City Subway coinciding with its opening on 26 July 1981. In 1982, it received the 22nd Laurel Prize.

Driver-only operation commenced on 20 January 1984, using automatic train control (ATC). The cabs are equipped with a master controller, brake handle, and automatic train stop (ATS) system for manual operation.

Refurbishment
Between 1997 and 2004, 15 years after the first trains were built and after the introduction of the 2000 series, the trains underwent refurbishment. After refurbishment, the trains were called 1000N series. Refurbishment included the following major modifications.
 Variable-frequency drive added
 Cab end window changed (similar to 2000 series)
 Large windows changed
 Rollsign destination indicators replaced with LED indicators
 Interior veneer panelling and floors changed
 Electronic displays showing next station, door chimes and wheelchair spaces

References

Electric multiple units of Japan
1000 series
Train-related introductions in 1981

External links
 車両情報(1000N系)
Kawasaki multiple units
Hitachi multiple units
Tokyu Car multiple units
Kinki Sharyo multiple units
Nippon Sharyo multiple units
1500 V DC multiple units of Japan